Live in Concert is the second live music video title by singer and actress Cher. Released by HBO in 1999, it contained footage from Cher's Do You Believe? Tour specials filmed at the MGM Grand Garden Arena in Paradise, Nevada in 1999. It featured tracks from her many of studio albums, such as Gypsys, Tramps & Thieves and Believe album, alongside various covers.

The video was certified Platinum in the UK and Brazil, and 2× Platinum in Australia.

Formats 
It was released on VHS and DVD. The special features on the DVD include a photo gallery, a little Cher biography, the costume designs and the full stage projections.

Track listing 
 "I Still Haven't Found What I'm Looking For"
 "All or Nothing"
 "The Power"
 "We All Sleep Alone"
 "I Found Someone"
 "The Way of Love"
 "Half-Breed"
 "Gypsies, Tramps and Thieves"
 "Dark Lady"
 "Take Me Home"
 "After All"
 "Walking in Memphis"
 "Just Like Jesse James"
 "The Shoop Shoop Song (It's in His Kiss)"
 "Dov'è L'Amore"
 "Strong Enough"
 "If I Could Turn Back Time"
 "Believe"

Promotional video
The music video of "All or Nothing" was released by Warner Bros. Records to promote the DVD. This video is a montage of a newly recorded performance of the song (with straight red wig) and clips of various other performances from the DVD recorded at the MGM, but the audio is the "All or Nothing" (Metro Radio Mix).

Certifications

See also 
 Do You Believe? Tour

References

External links 
 Cher Live in Concert The New York Post Review.

Cher video albums
1999 live albums
1999 video albums
Live video albums